Kang Kyun-sung (born 1981) is a South Korean singer and television personality. He is a member of the boy band Noel and is a cast member in the variety show Off to School. He also appears in the music videos for Sistar's "Shake It" and Bestie's "Excuse Me". He has made appearances on Korean variety shows such as Knowing Bros, Running Man, and more recently South Korean Foreigners.

Filmography

Television drama

References

1981 births
Living people
JYP Entertainment artists
Kyonggi University alumni
Singers from Seoul
South Korean pop singers
South Korean television personalities
21st-century South Korean male singers